Khumtai Assembly constituency is one of the 126 assembly constituencies of Assam Legislative Assembly. Khumtai forms part of the Kaliabor Lok Sabha constituency.

Members of Legislative Assembly 

 1978: Nogen Borua, Janata Party
 1983: Jiba Kanta Gogoi, Indian National Congress
 1985: Probin Kumar Gogoi, Independent
 1991: Jiba Kanta Gogoi, Indian National Congress
 1996: Probin Gogoi, Independent
 2001: Jiba Kanta Gogoi, Indian National Congress
 2002 (By Polls): Probin Gogoi, Asom Gana Parishad
 2006: Probin Gogoi, Asom Gana Parishad
 2011: Bismita Gogoi, Indian National Congress
 2016: Mrinal Saikia, Bharatiya Janata Party
 2021: Mrinal Saikia, Bharatiya Janata Party

Election results

2021 result

2016 result

External links

References

Assembly constituencies of Assam